Kiff is both a surname and a given name.

Surname
Kaleena Kiff (born 1974), American actress, producer, and director
Ken Kiff (1935–1961), English figurative painter

Given name
Kiff Gallagher, American musician, songwriter, and nonprofit administrator
Kiff Scholl, American character actor and television/film director
Kiff Slemmons (born 1944), American metalsmith and performance artist
Kiff VandenHeuvel, American actor, teacher, director, and podcast host

Nickname
The Kiffness (born 1988 as David Scott), South African musician, DJ and YouTuber

Entertainment
Kiff, an American TV series

Fictional characters
Kif Croker, from the animated television series Futurama
Kiff Chatterly, the main character of Kiff

See also
Hannington-Kiff sign, a clinical sign